Coagulant can refer to:
 Flocculation
 Coagulation of the blood
 Coagulation (water treatment)

See also
 Coagulation (disambiguation)